Lake Le Royer is a freshwater body integrated into a set of lakes designated "Obatogamau Lakes", within the Eeyou Istchee James Bay (municipality) area, within the administrative region of Nord-du-Québec, province of Quebec, Canada. This lake extends in the townships of Fancamp and La Dauversière.

Forestry is the main economic activity of the sector. Recreational tourism activities come second.

The hydrographic slope of Lac Royer is accessible by a branch of a forest road connecting to the north at route 113 (linking Lebel-sur-Quévillon and Chibougamau) and the Canadian National Railway.

The surface of Le Royer Lake is usually frozen from early November to mid-May, however, safe ice circulation is generally from mid-November to mid-April.

Geography 

The main hydrographic slopes near Le Royer Lake are:
North side: Chevrier Lake (Obatogamau River), Merrill Lake, Dorés Lake (Chibougamau River), Chibougamau Lake, Chibougamau River;
East side: La Dauversière Lake, Boisvert River, Rohault Lake;
South side: Nemenjiche Lake, Opawica River, Nemenjiche River;
West side: Verneuil Lake, Eau Jaune Lake, Muscocho Lake, Irene River, Obatogamau River.

Le Royer Lake empties on the North side by a short strait in Chevrier Lake (Obatogamau River).

Toponymy
The toponym "lac Le Royer" was formalized on December 5, 1968, by the Commission de toponymie du Québec, when it was created.

Notes and references

See also 

Eeyou Istchee James Bay
Lakes of Nord-du-Québec
Nottaway River drainage basin